Donald G. Alexander (born March 1942) is an American lawyer and former justice on the Maine Supreme Judicial Court.

Biography
Donald G. Alexander was appointed to the Maine Supreme Judicial Court in 1998 by Governor Angus King. He previously served on the Maine Superior Court and the Maine District Court and as a Deputy Attorney General for the State of Maine. He served in Washington, D.C. as an assistant to Maine Senator Edmund S. Muskie and as Legislative Counsel for the National League of Cities. Justice Alexander is a graduate of Bowdoin College and the University of Chicago Law School. He is the author of The Maine Jury Instruction Manual (4th. ed. 2008); and Maine Appellate Practice (3rd. ed. 2008), and a principal editor of The Maine Rules of Civil Procedure with Advisory Committee Notes and Practice Commentary (2008).

He has been an adjunct faculty member at the University of Maine School of Law and has been on the faculty of the Harvard Law School Trial Advocacy Workshop since 1980. He is the Court's liaison to the Advisory Committees on the Maine Rules of Civil Procedure and Probate Procedure, the State Court Library Committee, and the Maine State Bar Association Continuing Legal Education Committee.

He retired from active service on January 31, 2020.

See also
List of justices of the Maine Supreme Judicial Court

References

External links
Bowdoin College
The University of Chicago Law School
University of Maine School of Law
Maine Supreme Judicial Court Chronological List
Maine Supreme Judicial Court official website
The Supreme Judicial Court of the State of Maine, 1820 to 2007 - Cleaves Law Library

1942 births
Living people
Bowdoin College alumni
Harvard Law School faculty
Justices of the Maine Supreme Judicial Court
University of Chicago Law School alumni
20th-century American judges
21st-century American judges
University of Maine School of Law faculty